"Preacher Man" is a 1990 song recorded by English girl group Bananarama. It appears on the group's fifth studio album, Pop Life and was released as the album's second single. The track was co-written and produced by Youth with additional production and remix by Shep Pettibone.

"Tripping on Your Love" had been originally slated as the second single from the album, and some promotional singles of the song were sent to radio stations in late 1990. Around this time, group member Sara Dallin contracted meningitis, which delayed the release of the single some months. When she recovered, London Records decided "Preacher Man" was a better choice for a single and so it was released in December 1990. "Tripping on Your Love" was eventually released as the album's fourth single.

The pop/dance tune became the highest-charting and biggest-selling single released from the Pop Life album, climbing to number 20 in the UK singles chart. The single was Bananarama's last appearance in the UK top 20 until "Move in My Direction" in 2005. In Australia, the single peaked at #147 on the Australian ARIA singles chart. "Preacher Man" was not released in the United States.

The song was performed on The Original Line Up Tour in 2017-2018. Despite being recorded after she left, original member Siobhan Fahey has always liked the song and chose to include it in the setlist.

Critical reception
Pan-European magazine Music & Media wrote, "Strong hooks and strong looks. A catchy tune with undeniable pop appeal. Watch the striking harp solo in the middle." Gary Crossing from Record Mirror commented, "Those sexy mistresses of unison vocals return to form with a supremely contagious dance offering. Once again produced by Youth and remixed by Shep Pettibone, this has a powerful, gloopy bassline and a wondrous bluesy harmonica bit in the middle. Long may the 'Nanas fill the dancefloors." Caroline Sullivan from Smash Hits said the song sounded like "everything they did with S/A/W" and noted "the chugging beat, same slick strings and the harmonica solo." In review of 5 January 1991 Paul Elliott of Sounds considered that this song "melds '70s and '90s dance sounds." In the end Elliott summarized: "Produced by Youth and remixed by Shep Pettibone, it throbs yet sparkles, evocative of the dreamiest, most hypnotic and heady '70s disco raves."

Music video
The accompanying music video for the song featured a man in a tank top tied to a chair in the interrogation room of a prison. As he breaks down and goes crazy, Bananarama and various carnival-like entertainers (such as a midget and a girl in a winged outfit) appear as hallucinations before him. These scenes are intercut with scenes of the girls performing the song in front of candles or standing against a wall. Harmonica player Johnny Mars appears on the video. The video was directed by long-time collaborator Andy Morahan and would be the last video he directed for the group until "Stuff Like That" from In Stereo in 2019.

Official versions and remixes
"Preacher Man" (Album Version) - (3:15)
"Preacher Man" (Ramabanana Alternative Mix) - (7:31) (Remixed by Shep Pettibone)
"Preacher Man" (Shep's Club Mix) - (7:19) (Remixed by Shep Pettibone)
"Preacher Man" (Shep's Dub Mix) - (4:44) (Remixed by Shep Pettibone)
"Preacher Man" (Bonus Beats Dub) (Remixed by Shep Pettibone)
"Preacher Man" (Shep's Instrumental) (Remixed by Shep Pettibone)
"Preacher Man" (Alternative 7" Mix) - (3:38) (Remixed by Shep Pettibone)
"Preacher Man" (Original 12" Mix) - (6:07) (Unreleased until 2013)

Personnel
Bananarama
Sara Dallin - Vocals
Jacquie O'Sullivan - Vocals
Keren Woodward - Vocals

Musicians
Peter 'Ski' Schwartz - Keyboards

Charts

References

1990 singles
Bananarama songs
London Records singles
Music videos directed by Andy Morahan
Songs written by Youth (musician)
Songs written by Sara Dallin
1990 songs